Harry Cooper may refer to:

 Harry Cooper (golfer) (1904–2000), American golfer
 Harry Cooper (soccer) (died 1963), also known as Buck Cooper,  American soccer player
 Harry Cooper (veterinarian) (born 1944), Australian TV presenter and veterinarian
 Harry L. Cooper (1870–1935), United States Army Colonel and military aviation pioneer
 Harry Cooper, trumpeter with the Duke Ellington Orchestra
 Harry Cooper (Eagle Scout), first known African-American Eagle Scout

See also
 Henry Cooper (disambiguation)
 Harold Cooper (disambiguation)